Hungary competed at the 2006 Winter Olympics in Turin, Italy.

Alpine skiing

Biathlon

Bobsleigh

Cross-country skiing 

Distance

Sprint

Figure skating 

Key: CD = Compulsory Dance, FD = Free Dance, FS = Free Skate, OD = Original Dance, SP = Short Program

Short track speed skating 

Key: 'ADV' indicates a skater was advanced due to being interfered with.

References

Nations at the 2006 Winter Olympics
2006
Winter Olympics